Death of a Dead Day is the second studio album by British progressive metal band Sikth, as well as the last released before their 2008–2013 hiatus. It was released on 6 June 2006 (06/06/06) in the United States and 26 June in the United Kingdom; the first 4000 copies came with hand autographed fold out posters. It was released on vinyl by Basick Records as part of Record Store Day 2014.

Track listing

Credits

Music
Mikee Goodman – vocals
Justin Hill – vocals
Dan Weller – guitars
Graham "Pin" Pinney – guitars
James Leach – bass
Dan "Loord" Foord – drums, percussion

Songwriting
All music by Weller/Pinney/Leach/Foord
All lyrics by Goodman, except certain sections of "Where Do We Fall?" by Hill

Production
Produced by Sikth
Mixed and engineered by Matt Laplant
Additional mixing on "Mermaid Slur" by Simon Hanhart at Spare Room Studios
Post-production by Weller and Hill
Mastered by Mike Fuller at Fullersound Miami, Florida
Artwork & design by Tim Fox
Photography by Matthew Swig

References

External links

Sikth albums
2006 albums
Bieler Bros. Records albums
Albums produced by Dan Weller